Revolut is a British-Lithuanian neobank and financial technology company that offers banking services. Revolut Bank UAB is licensed and regulated by the Bank of Lithuania within the European Union. Headquartered in London, it was founded in 2015 by Nikolay Storonsky and Vlad Yatsenko. It offers accounts featuring currency exchange, debit cards, virtual cards, Apple Pay, interest-bearing "vaults", stock trading, crypto, commodities, and other services.

In 2020 Revolut expanded into Japan and the US and expanded its staff from 1,500 to 6,000. In November 2020 it was breaking even and, with a £4.2 billion valuation became the UK's most valuable fintech company. In January 2021 Revolut applied for a UK banking licence, but  the outcome was still awaited. A US$800 million funding round in July 2021 brought the company's valuation to US$33 billion, making it the most valuable UK tech startup at the time.

Since Revolut does not have UK bank status, it does not reimburse victims of authorized push payment fraud in that country.

History 
Revolut was founded on 1 July 2015 by Nikolay Storonsky from Russia and Vlad Yatsenko from Ukraine. The company was originally based in Level39, a financial technology incubator in Canary Wharf, London.

It began offering cryptocurrency services in 2017, beginning with crypto trading.

On 26 April 2018, Revolut raised $250 million in Series C funding. It had a post-funding valuation of US$1.7 billion, making it a unicorn. DST Global was founded by Yuri Milner, who has been backed by the Kremlin in his previous investments.

In December 2018, Revolut secured a Challenger bank licence from the European Central Bank, facilitated by the Bank of Lithuania, authorising it to accept deposits and offer consumer credits, but not to provide investment services. At the same time, an Electronic Money Institution licence was also issued by the Bank of Lithuania.

In March 2019 Revolut united with Dax, the same year the company's chief financial officer Peter O'Higgins resigned. TechCrunch reported that he had quit following allegations of compliance lapses, however Revolut denied that he had left for these reasons.

In July 2019, Revolut launched commission-free stock trading on the New York Stock Exchange and Nasdaq, initially for customers in its Metal plan. This was subsequently made available to all users.

In August 2019, the company announced several hires with experience in traditional banking, including Wolfgang Bardorf, formerly executive director at Goldman Sachs and the global head of liquidity models and methodologies at Deutsche Bank, Philip Doyle, previously head of financial crime at ClearBank and fraud prevention manager at Visa, and Stefan Wille, previously senior vice-president of finance at N26 and corporate finance manager at Credit Suisse.

In October 2019, the company announced a global deal with Visa, following which it expanded into 24 new markets and hired 3,500 additional staff.

In February 2020, Revolut completed a funding round that more than tripled its value, valuing the company at £4.2 billion and becoming the United Kingdom's most valuable financial technology startup.

In March 2020, Revolut was launched in the United States. In August, the company launched its financial app in Japan.

In November 2020, Revolut became profitable.

In January 2021, the company announced that it had applied for a UK banking licence. In March 2021, Revolut applied for a bank charter in the US via applications with the FDIC and the California Department of Financial Protection.

In July 2021, Revolut raised US$800 million from investors, including SoftBank Group and Tiger Global Management, at a US$33 billion valuation.

In January 2022, Revolut launched as a bank (instead of an e-money institution) in 10 additional European countries: Belgium, Denmark, Finland, Germany, Iceland, Liechtenstein, Luxembourg, Netherlands, Spain, and Sweden.

In March 2022, after Russia invaded Ukraine, Storonsky publicly opposed the war in Ukraine and Revolut donated £1.5 million to the Red Cross Ukraine appeal. In March 2022, Revolut had 18 million customers around the world and was making 150 million transactions a month.

In September 2022, Revolut confirmed a cyberattack exposed personal data of 50,000 of its 20m customers. In the same month, The UK’s Financial Conduct Authority added Revolut to its list of companies authorized to offer cryptocurrency products and services; it had offered crypto trading since 2017 but had not been regulated.

In November 2022, Revolut had 25 million customers.

In January 2023, Revolut announced it would transfer its 2 million Irish customers to a new Irish branch and move these customers from Lithuanian IBANs to Irish IBANs, in a bid to compete with the remaining incumbent banks following the exit of RBS and KBC Bank from Ireland.

Revolut accounts began allowing staking for holders of proof-of-stake cryptocurrencies in the UK and European Economic Area in 2023. The ability to delegate stake and earn rewards for helping to maintain a blockchain is part of proof-of-stake blockchains Cardano (ADA), Ether (ETH), Polkadot (DOT), and Tezos (XTZ).

Services
Revolut offers banking services including GBP and EUR bank accounts, debit cards, currency exchange, stock trading, cryptocurrency exchange and peer-to-peer payments. Revolut's mobile app supports spending and ATM withdrawals in 120 currencies and transfers in 29 currencies directly from the app. Payments at weekends incur an extra fee of 0.5% to 2%, protecting Revolut against exchange rate fluctuations.

It also provides customers access to cryptocurrencies such as Bitcoin, Ethereum, Litecoin, Bitcoin Cash, Cardano and XRP by exchanging with 25 fiat currencies. A fee of 1.49% for buying or selling applies. Crypto cannot be deposited or spent, only converted back to fiat inside Revolut. Additionally, Revolut banks with Metropolitan Commercial Bank of New York, which does not allow the transfer of fiat money to or from cryptocurrency exchanges.

Revolut provides an equities trading facility, with access to a range of US stocks and fractional share purchase/sale. Stocks purchased in the app cannot be transferred to another broker, but must be sold/converted back to cash, which can then be withdrawn.

Controversies

Automated suspension of accounts
Revolut, in common with traditional financial institutions, uses algorithms to identify money laundering, fraud and other criminal activity, but unlike the rest of the banking industry, Revolut's algorithms additionally trigger an automated suspension of accounts. Revolut explains that "the system is programmed to temporarily lock an account and place it in a queue, until one of our compliance agents can review the case".

It was reported in 2020 that Revolut's algorithms suspended accounts in error for weeks or months at a time because Revolut did not have sufficient compliance agents to review the automated suspensions sooner. While Revolut paid no interest on the large suspended balances, it could earn interest on the funds in wholesale money markets. Customers whose accounts were suspended were blocked from contacting Revolut's usual chat support channel and instead received automated responses from a chatbot. The Daily Telegraph reported that Revolut suspended an account containing £90,000 for more than two months and that another customer travelled 500 miles from Auvergne in France to Revolut's London offices in an unsuccessful attempt to recover £15,000 in an account that Revolut had similarly frozen without any justification being given. In a further case reported by The Times, Revolut suspended and subsequently closed a business account containing €300,000 belonging to Priorité Energie, which "helps low-income families in Paris to insulate their homes under a government initiative", preventing the company from paying its staff.

According to Finews.com, Revolut's public internet forums in 2020 contained almost 500 complaints by customers about locked accounts and a lack of response from Revolut's support team.

Employment practices
In March 2019, Wired published an exposé of the company's employment practices and work culture. This found evidence of unpaid work, high staff turnover and employees being ordered to work weekends to meet performance indicators. A later article in December 2019 by Sifted noted that Revolut had a higher rating than its peers on Glassdoor.

In June 2020, Wired published a further exposé of Revolut's dismissal of employees during the COVID-19 pandemic, in which employees, particularly in Kraków, were given the choice of being terminated for underperformance or a mutual agreement to leave the company voluntarily, in order to reduce the headline number of 62 redundancies announced by Revolut. The report explained that "Current and former Revolut employees say staff were coerced into accepting terminations, even though the company had no legal grounds to fire them" and that employees in Porto were pressured into agreeing to a salary sacrifice scheme in order to keep their jobs. According to Wired, in a message sent to the 495-strong customer support team on Slack shortly after the salary sacrifice scheme was announced, head of support Inna Grynova urged them to participate:

Non-reimbursement of fraud victims
 Revolut, as an e-money company offering digital banking services rather than a UK bank, is not signed up to the voluntary Contingent Reimbursement Model Scheme (CRM) and, unlike banks, refused to reimburse victims of authorized push payment fraud.

See also 
 bunq
 Klarna
 N26
 Wise (company)

References

External links
 
 

Foreign exchange companies
Digital currency exchanges
Financial services companies of the United Kingdom
Banks based in the City of London
Financial technology companies
Cryptocurrencies